Thomas Duncombe may refer to:

 Thomas Slingsby Duncombe (1796–1861), British Radical politician; Member of Parliament for Hertford, 1826–1832, and Finsbury, 1834–1861
 Thomas Duncombe (died 1746) (c. 1683–1746), British Member of Parliament for Downton, 1711–1713, and Ripon, 1734–1741
 Thomas Duncombe (died 1779) (1724–1779), British Member of Parliament for Downton, 1751–1754 and 1768–1775, and Morpeth, 1754–1768